Boffa is a town and sub-prefecture located on Guinea's coast. It is the capital of Boffa Prefecture. Boffa is the nearest town to the mouth of the River Pongo. As of 2014 it had a population of 8,631 people.

Climate
Boffa has a tropical monsoon climate (Köppen climate classification Am).
<div style="width:75%">

Hospitals 
 Hôpital Préfectoral de Boffa

Houses of Worship 
 Grande Mosquée de Boffa

References

Sub-prefectures of the Boké Region